is a 1957 black-and-white Japanese film directed by Teinosuke Kinugasa. It is an adaptation of the latter part of the classic The Tale of Genji.

Cast 
 Kazuo Hasegawa as Kaoru-no-kimi
 Fujiko Yamamoto as Ukifune
 Raizo Ichikawa as Niō-no-miya 
 Nobuko Otowa as Naka-no-kimi
 Aiko Mimasu as Chūjō
 Nakamura Ganjirō II as the Emperor
 Tamao Nakamura as Ukifune's Maid
 Yōko Uraji as Ni-no-miya
 Eijirō Yanagi as Minister of Shirafuji
 Shunji Natsume as Ukon

References

External links 
 
 
 

Japanese black-and-white films
1957 films
Films directed by Teinosuke Kinugasa
Daiei Film films
Films scored by Ichirō Saitō
1950s Japanese films